Toranosuke "Tora" Takagi (高木 虎之介; born 12 February 1974) is a Japanese former racing driver.

Early career 
Takagi was heavily influenced by his father, a touring car driver. In the early 1980s he began racing karts, competing in his first championship kart race in 1987. After winning several All Japan National Kart A2 series races, Takagi ended his kart racing career in 1991 and began racing Formula Toyota in 1992. In 1993, he began competing in All Japan Formula Three, finishing 10th in his rookie season.

Formula One

During his performance in a 1994 race he drew the attention of Japanese Formula One driver Satoru Nakajima, joining the Nakajima Racing team and competing in Formula 3000. He was heavily involved in the team from 1995 until he was chosen as Tyrrell's Formula One test driver in 1997. Takagi later competed with the Arrows Formula One team, and his European popularity was on the rise. However, there were organizational and communication problems between Takagi and both teams, and he left Formula One at the end of the  season.

Post–Formula One career
In 2000, Takagi joined Nakajima Racing's Formula Nippon team, earning eight victories in ten races, the most dominant performance ever by a driver in the series. He later competed in CART (Champ Car) for the Walker Racing team in 2001 and 2002 finishing in a career-best 4th place in Houston, Texas. He transferred to Indy Racing League and joined Mo Nunn Racing, finishing 10th in 2003. In the same year, he competed in the Indianapolis 500, starting in 7th place and finishing in 5th, earning him the Indianapolis 500 Rookie of the Year award.

After another, largely disappointing season in the IndyCar Series, Takagi returned to Japan in 2005 to compete in Formula Nippon once again, taking part ownership of the Cerumo team and running one of their cars in his own name (Takagi Planning with CERUMO).  Takagi also was one of the co-drivers of the #38 Toyota Supra Super GT car, claiming the series title along with Yuji Tachikawa. Takagi's title made him the first Super GT rookie to become champion in the GT500 class since John Nielsen and David Brabham in 1996, as well as the last until Jenson Button in 2018.

Career timeline 

1987 – Finished 8th in Japanese A2 National Kart Series championship.
1988 – Finished 4th in Japanese A2 National Kart Series championship.
1989 – Won the Japanese A2 National Kart Series championship.
1990 – Won the Japanese A2 National Kart Series championship.
1991 – Finished 2nd in Japanese FA National Kart Series championship.
1992 – Won two races in Formula Toyota.
1993 – Finished 10th in his rookie season in Japanese Formula 3 championship.
1994 – Finished 6th in Japanese Formula 3 championship. Spot participation in Japanese Formula 3000 championship from Nakajima Planning, scoring three top-10 finishes. 
1995 – Finished 2nd in Japanese Formula 3000 championship with Nakajima Planning, scoring three victories.
1996 – Finished 4th in Japanese Formula Nippon championship (ex Japanese F3000)with Nakajima Planning, scoring two victories.
1997 – Served as test driver for Tyrrell Formula One team. Takagi scored one victory en route to finishing 6th in Japanese Formula Nippon championship with Nakajima Planning.
1998 – Drove in Formula One in rookie year driving for Tyrrell. He finished in the top-10 twice, including ninth at Silverstone and Monza.
1999 – Competed in Formula One with Arrows, scoring two top-10 finishes, including a career-best seventh at Melbourne (Australian Grand Prix).
2000 – Won eight of 10 races en route to winning the Japanese Formula Nippon series title with Nakajima Planning .
2001 – Finished 21st in CART point standings in rookie year driving for Walker Racing. He finished in the top-10 three times, including a career-best fourth at Houston. 
2002 – Finished 15th in CART point standings with Walker Racing. He finished in the top-10 seven times, including tying career-best finish with a fourth place at Chicago. 
2003 – Finished 10th in Indy Racing League point standings in rookie year driving for Mo Nunn Racing. He scored nine top-10 finishes, including a season-best third in June at Texas. He started seventh and finished fifth in first Indianapolis 500, the highest-finishing rookie. He won the Indianapolis 500 Rookie of the Year award.
2004 – Competed in the Indy Racing League IndyCar Series with Mo Nunn Racing.
2005 – Competed in Formula Nippon as owner-driver of Takagi Planning with CERUMO.

Career results

Complete Japanese Formula 3000/Formula Nippon results
(key) (Races in bold indicate pole position; races in italics indicate fastest lap)

Complete Formula One results
(key)

Complete American Open Wheel racing results
(key)

CART

IndyCar Series

Indianapolis 500

External links

 Toranosuke Takagi official website

1974 births
Living people
Japanese racing drivers
Japanese Formula One drivers
Tyrrell Formula One drivers
Arrows Formula One drivers
Indianapolis 500 Rookies of the Year
IndyCar Series drivers
Indianapolis 500 drivers
Champ Car drivers
Japanese Formula 3000 Championship drivers
Formula Nippon drivers
Japanese Formula 3 Championship drivers
Super GT drivers
Karting World Championship drivers
People from Shizuoka (city)
Japanese IndyCar Series drivers
Mo Nunn Racing drivers
Team LeMans drivers
Walker Racing drivers
Nakajima Racing drivers